Margaret Leahy (17 August 1902 – 17 February 1967) was a British actress. After winning a beauty contest, Leahy went on to make only one film in her very short-lived film career.

Life and film career

In 1922, sisters Constance Talmadge and Norma Talmadge, Joseph Schenck and film director Edward Jose held a contest in England to find a new leading lady. The contestants reputedly numbered nearly 80,000 and the competition resulted in three girls thought suitable: Leahy, Katherine Campbell, and Agnès Souret who proceeded to travel to Hollywood at the end of 1922.

Born in London, Leahy was described by Norma Talmadge, as "the most ravishing girl in England". Although it was said by her publicity that the young beauty queen had acted in English and French films in Europe, this proved to be untrue, especially after director Frank Lloyd had her dismissed from Within the Law (1923), which was supposed to be Leahy's big film debut, claiming that the actress could do nothing that an actress was supposed to be able to do.

Leahy was selected as one of thirteen WAMPAS Baby Stars in 1923, probably due to the help of producer Joseph Schenck, Norma Talmadge's husband, who had signed a three-year contract with the girl. Following this, Schenck handed Margaret over to his brother-in-law Buster Keaton to appear in his next comedy, for Schenck believed it did not take much for an actress to be a comedian.

Leahy's only film, Three Ages (1923), directed by Buster Keaton, did absolutely nothing to improve her already crumbling film career. Leahy's role was not given much attention, and she never acted again. Following this one film, Leahy chose to remain in California and get married, instead of returning to England. She later became an interior decorator and grew to despise the movie industry. She apparently committed suicide in Los Angeles, California, at the age of 64.

References

External links

Margaret Leahy's Story at the International Buster Keaton Society

1902 births
1967 deaths
Actresses from London
English silent film actresses
Suicides in California
20th-century English actresses
WAMPAS Baby Stars
British expatriate actresses in the United States
1967 suicides